Pachylia darceta is a moth of the family Sphingidae first described by Herbert Druce in 1881.

Distribution 
It is known from Panama, Costa Rica, Venezuela, Brazil and Bolivia.

Description 
There are three oblique black lines on the forewing upperside and two in the basal half of the wing. The hindwing upperside is uniform brown without markings.

Biology 
There are probably multiple generations per year. Adults have been recorded from early August to September in Brazil.

References

Dilophonotini
Moths described in 1881